Temple Heights Christian School, located in Tampa, Florida, was a ministry of Temple Heights Baptist Church and was one of the oldest Christian schools in the state of Florida. The school was founded in 1958 with 64 students attending kindergarten through sixth grade. Temple Heights Christian School was a founding member of the Florida Association of Christian Colleges and Schools and was also a member of the American Association of Christian Schools.

History
The school's tax exemption was revoked by the Internal Revenue Service after it declined to document that it had a racial nondiscriminatory admissions policy.

The school was closed and the property sold in 2007.

References

Private elementary schools in Florida
Private middle schools in Florida
Educational institutions established in 1958
Schools in Tampa, Florida
1958 establishments in Florida
2007 disestablishments in Florida
Defunct schools in Florida
Segregation academies in Florida
Educational institutions disestablished in 2007